Felitto is a town and comune in the province of Salerno in the Campania region of south-west Italy. It is famous for  fusilli, a kind of handmade pasta, and the annual Fusillo festival.

History
The town was founded at the beginning of the 10th century. Much of the medieval old town has been preserved.

Geography
Located on a valley above Calore river below the mount Chianiello (1,314 amsl), in the middle of Cilento, the municipality borders with Castel San Lorenzo, Laurino, Magliano Vetere, Monteforte Cilento and Roccadaspide.

It counts no proper hamlets (frazioni) but several minor localities, that are Acqua delle Donne, Acquanoceta, Alvani, Barbagiano, Bosco Grande, Carpineto, Carrozzo, Casale, Cerzito, Chianelisi, Difesa Lombi, Difesa Principe, Fossa del Lupo, Lago, Maruzza, Mazzarella, Montagnano, Palumbo, Pazzano, Piano d'Elise, Pietracute, Remolino, San Giorgio, San Vito, Santoianni, Serre, Starza, Territorio, Torre and Vignali.

Main sights

Medieval old town and old bridge
Canyon and waterfall of Gole del Calore

People
Matteo de Augustinis (1799-1845), lawyer and economist

See also
Cilentan dialect
Cilento and Vallo di Diano National Park

References

External links 

Official website   
Felitto.net - Study and research group  
Felitto.org - Political news and more  
 Il Fusillo S.a.s - "Fusillo Felittese", typical gastronomy  

Cities and towns in Campania
Localities of Cilento